Wonderland (lit. Wonders), also known as The Wonders is an Israeli film directed by Avi Nesher from 2013.  It is a comic thriller and tribute to the genre of film noir.

Plot
Ariel Navon (Uri Hezekiah), who goes by the nickname Rabbit, is a young Hiloni who lives and works as a bartender in Jerusalem. With him is his former partner, Vax (Efrat Gosh) who is in the process of becoming more religious. At nights, Rabbit paints graffiti and covers his face to avoid the police. One evening, Rabbit sees three religious men bringing a covered figure into an abandoned building opposite his apartment window. The next day, he meets a private investigator named Jacob Ghitis (Adir Miller), who wishes to use a Rabbit's apartment for a view of the abandoned building. Rabbit swings between refusal and acceptance and finally agrees to allow the investigator to install a hidden camera in his apartment. The film was influenced by an incident where popular religious Israeli figure, Rabbi Nir Ben-Artzi, disappeared from the public for three years.

Cast
Uri Hezekiah - Rabbit (Hebrew: ארנב) / Ariel Navon
Adir Miller - Yaakov Gitis
Yehuda Levy - Rav Shaya Knafo
Yuval Scharf - Ela Gorski
Efrat Gosh - Vax
Shanan Street - Seller kiosk
Gavri Banay - Login pub

References

External links
 

2013 films
Israeli comedy films
2010s Hebrew-language films
Films directed by Avi Nesher
Films set in Jerusalem